Daniel McIntyre Collegiate Institute is a high school located in Winnipeg, Manitoba. Founded in the late 19th century, the school is named after Daniel McIntyre, Winnipeg's first school superintendent.

Notable alumni
Bill Norrie (1929-2012), Winnipeg mayor
Kurt Winter (1946-1997), musician
Hal Sigurdson, journalist

References

External links
 Daniel McIntyre Collegiate Institute

High schools in Winnipeg
Educational institutions in Canada with year of establishment missing

Schools in downtown Winnipeg